Full-Parasites  is a transcriptome database of apicomplexa parasites.

See also
 apicomplexa

References

External links
 http://fullmal.hgc.jp/

Biological databases
Apicomplexa
Gene expression